Kate Andersen Brower is an American journalist and author who has written three books about the White House, two of which have been New York Times bestsellers, The Residence: Inside the Private World of the White House, First Women: The Grace & Power of America's Modern First Ladies, First in Line: Presidents, Vice presidents, and the Pursuit of Power, and Team of Five: The presidents Club in the Age of Trump. She covered the White House for Bloomberg News during President Barack Obama's first term and before that she worked at CBS News and Fox News as a producer. She is also a CNN contributor and has written for The New York Times, Vanity Fair, The Washington Post, and The Smithsonian.

Education

She is a graduate of Barnard College and Oxford University.

Writings 

Brower's book The Residence: Inside the Private World of the White House has been called a "groundbreaking" backstairs look at the maids and butlers and other professionals who work at the White House. The book hit number 1 on the nonfiction New York Times Best Seller list. Netflix has optioned the TV rights to the book with Shonda Rhimes producing.

Her second nonfiction book, First Women: The Grace & Power of America's Modern First Ladies, examined the lives of the First Ladies of the United States. The book was called a "gossipy, but surprisingly deep, look at the women who help and sometimes overshadow their powerful husbands."

Her third nonfiction book, First in Line, covers every vice president of the modern era, from Richard Nixon to Joe Biden and Mike Pence.

Brower's fourth nonfiction book, Team of Five: The presidents Club in the Age of Trump, examines what has been characterized as the world's most exclusive club, membership limited to the former presidents of the United States.  Brower looks at the relationships between the former American presidents as well as the strains between this rarified group and the (at that time) current occupant of the Oval Office, Donald Trump.

Brower authored Elizabeth Taylor: The Grit and Glamour of an Icon, the first authorized biography of actress and activist Elizabeth Taylor, in 2022.

Bibliography 
 The Residence: Inside the Private World of the White House (2015) 
 First Women: The Grace & Power of America's Modern First Ladies (2017) 
 First in Line: Presidents, Vice presidents, and the Pursuit of Power (2018) 
 Team of Five: The presidents Club in the Age of Trump (2020) 
 Elizabeth Taylor: The Grit and Glamour of an Icon (2022)

References

External links

Living people
American women journalists
21st-century American women writers
Year of birth missing (living people)
CBS News people
Fox News people
CNN people
21st-century American non-fiction writers
21st-century American journalists
American women non-fiction writers
Barnard College alumni
Alumni of the University of Oxford